Dražen Ričl (12 March 1962 – 1 October 1986) was a Bosnian rock musician and comedian, best known as the first lead vocalist of popular Sarajevo-based rock band Crvena jabuka.

Biography 
Ričl was born in Sarajevo to Czech father Ferdinand Ritchel and Bosniak mother Elvira Deak. He grew up in Sarajevo's Višnjik neighborhood, where he was known by the nicknames Para and Zijo. Upon finishing musical high school, he started studying journalism at the University of Sarajevo, where he met future fellow musician Branko Đurić. Soon, Zijo abandoned his studies to start playing in his first band Ozbiljno pitanje (Serious Question) in 1981. The band also featured Zlatko Arslanagić, future co-founder of Crvena Jabuka. In 1983, Ričl joined one of the greatest acts of the New Primitives movement, Elvis J. Kurtović & His Meteors. Simultaneously, he was one of the leading actors in the first season of the popular absurd comedy TV series Top lista nadrealista, which was also created as a part of the New Primitives movement.

With Crvena jabuka 
At the beginning of 1985, Ričl left Elvis J. Kurtović & His Meteors to join forces with Arslanagić once again, this time forming Crvena jabuka (Red Apple, the name making a reference to The Beatles). Aljoša Buha, Dražen Žerić Žera and Darko Jelčić Cunja all joined the band over the next several months and they started rehearsing in the attic of Arslanagić's house. In 1986, the band released its self-titled first album that quickly gained immense popularity. Ričl and Arslanagić, as the leading authors, combined the rudeness and simplicity of New Primitivism with romantic themes, characteristic of the bands they have considered their predecessors, such as The Beatles and Indexi.

Death 
In late summer 1986, as a consequence of the outstanding sales of Crvena Jabuka's debut album, the band booked the Bosnia-Herzegovina leg of a planned Yugoslavia-wide tour, the opening date of which was scheduled for Thursday, 18 September 1986 in Mostar at the Kantarevac Stadium, an outdoor multi-use facility that had primarily been used for handball. On the day of the concert, the band members and their small entourage traveled to Mostar from Sarajevo in three cars: vocalist and lead guitarist Ričl, rhythm guitarist Arslanagić, and bassist Buha were in Arslanagić's Zastava 750, keyboardist Žerić and drummer Jelčić were in Žerić's Volkswagen Golf Mk1 while employees of the Zenica-based Atlas company, the organizers of the tour, were in a Zastava 1500. On a single lane bidirectional road next to the Neretva river near the town of Jablanica, the Zastava 750 driven by Arslanagić veered into oncoming traffic colliding head-on with a truck registered with Vršac (VŠ) licence plates. 

Buha died instantly while Ričl, who fell into a coma, was airlifted to Belgrade's Military Medical Academy (VMA), where he would succumb to injuries two weeks later on 1 October 1986. Arslanagić had survived the accident and, following a severe depression, continued to work with the remaining members of the band. Fellow musicians across Yugoslavia paid tribute to the victims of the accident and organized concerts in memory of the lost members of Crvena jabuka. After a year, the surviving members of the band began to work on their second album Za sve ove godine, which was created as an homage to Ričl and Buha.

Ričl is buried in the Bare Cemetery in Sarajevo.

Discography

Elvis J. Kurtović & His Meteors
 Mitovi i legende o kralju Elvisu (1984)
 Da bog da crk'o rok'n'rol (1985)

Crvena Jabuka
 Crvena Jabuka (1986)

References

1962 births
1986 deaths
Bosnia and Herzegovina guitarists
Bosnia and Herzegovina rock singers
Bosnia and Herzegovina people of Czech descent
Bosnia and Herzegovina male guitarists
Yugoslav male singers
Road incident deaths in Bosnia and Herzegovina
Musicians from Sarajevo
20th-century Bosnia and Herzegovina male singers
20th-century guitarists
Burials at Bare Cemetery, Sarajevo
New Primitivism people
Top lista nadrealista